Dora Pavel (born June 29, 1946) is a Romanian novelist, short-story writer, poet, and journalist.

Biography
Born as Dora Voicu to Viorica Pop and Eugen Voicu, both teachers, Dora Pavel graduated from the Decebal College in Deva (1964), and the Faculty of Letters of the Babeş-Bolyai University in Cluj (1969).

She graduated Decebal College in Deva (1964), and the Faculty of Letters of the Babeş-Bolyai University in Cluj (1969). She became professor of Romanian language in Alba Iulia and Deva, then researcher at the Institute of Linguistics and Literary History in Cluj; since 1990, she has worked as editor at the local Radio Station of Cluj, where she specialises in topics of Romanian language and literature.

She made her poetry debut in the literary magazine Steaua (1972), and her editorial debut in the collective volume Alpha '84 (1984) at Dacia Publishing House. She also publishes poetry and prose in such literary magazines as Tribuna, Steaua, Contrapunct, Apostrof, Contemporanul-Ideea Europeană, România literară, Viaţa românească, Poesis, Familia and Vatra.

Works

Poetry
 Naraţiuni întâmplătoare (Casual Narratives), Cluj, Ed. Dacia, 1989.
 Poemul deshumat (The Exhumed Poem), Cluj, Ed. Dacia, 1994.
 Creier intermediar (Intermediary Brains), Oradea, Ed. Cogito, 1997.
 Muncile lui Don Quijote (The Labours of Don Quixote, an anthology), Piteşti, Ed. Paralela 45, 2000.

Short stories
 Întoarce-te, Esthera (Come Back, Esthera), Cluj, Ed. "Biblioteca Apostrof", 1999.
 Animal în alertă, Cluj, Ed. Dacia XXI, 2010

Novels
 Agata murind (Dying Agata), Cluj, Ed. Dacia, 2003; 2nd ed., Iaşi, Ed. Polirom, 2004; 3rd ed., Iaşi, Ed. Polirom, 2014.
 Captivul (The Captive), Iaşi, Ed. Polirom, 2006; 2nd ed., Iaşi, Ed. Polirom, 2017.
 Pudră (Powder), Iaşi, Ed. Polirom, 2010.
 Do Not Cross, Iași, Ed. Polirom, 2013.
 Agata muriendo, translated by Marian Ochoa de Eribe, Madrid, Editorial Crealite, 2013.
 No pasar (Do Not Cross), translated by Doina Făgădaru, Madrid, Dos Bigotes, 2018.
 Bastian, Iași, Ed. Polirom, 2020.
 Crush, Iași, Ed. Polirom, 2022.

Interviews
 Armele seducţiei (Weapons of Seduction; Dialogues), Cluj, Casa Cărţii de Ştiinţă, 2007.
 Rege şi ocnaş (King and Prisoner), Cluj, Casa Cărţii de Ştiinţă, 2008.
 Gheorghe Grigurcu, O provocare adresată destinului. Convorbiri cu Dora Pavel, Satu Mare, Pleiade, 2009.

Anthologies
 Young Poets of a New Romania, London & Boston, Forest Books, 1991.
 Transylvanian Voices. An Anthology of Contemporary Poets of Cluj-Napoca, Iaşi, The Center for Romanian Studies, 1997.
 Vid Tystnadens Bord, Stockholm, Symposion, 1998.
 Poètes roumains contemporains, Ottawa, Écrits des Forges, 2000.
 Il romanzo rumeno contemporaneo (1989-2010). Teorie e proposte di lettura, a cura di Nicoleta Nesu, edizione italiana di Angela Tarantino, premessa di Luisa Valmarin, Bagatto Libri, Roma, 2010.
 Fiction 16: Contemporary Romanian Prose, Iaşi, Ed. Polirom, 2010.

Editions
 Biblia de la Blaj (1795) (The Bible of Blaj), Rome (in collaboration with Tipografia Vaticana), 2000

Affiliations
 Member of The Writers' Union of Romania
 Member of The Professional Journalists' Union of Romania

Awards
 Romanian Academy's Award, Timotei Cipariu (2000)
 Romanian Writers' Union Award for fiction (2003)
 The I. D. Sârbu Award of The Writers' Union, Cluj (2006)
 The Pavel Dan Award of The Writers' Union, Cluj (2007, 2010)
 The Best Book of the Year – Literary Journalism Award of The Writers' Union, Cluj (2007)
 The Ion Agârbiceanu Award of The Writers' Union, Cluj (2013)

References

Sources
   Dying Agata: Review by Marius Chivu, in România literară, no. 7, February 23 – March 1, 2005
  Interview by Oana Cristea Grigorescu, in Observator cultural, no. 67, Juny 14, 2006
  The Captive: Review by Andrei Simuţ, in Observator cultural, no. 102, February 15-21, 2007
  Weapons of Seduction: Review by Gheorghe Grigurcu, in România literară, no. 2, January 11-17, 2008
  Powder: Review by Irina Turcanu, in Sul Romanzo, November 10, 2010
  Do Not Cross: Review by Cosmin Ciotloș, in România literară, no. 33, 2013
  Do Not Cross: Review by Alex Goldiș, in România literară, no. 39, 2013
  Do Not Cross: Review by Mauro Barindi, in Orizzonti culturali italo-romeni / Orizonturi culturale italo-române, nr. 11, November 2013
  Giovanni Magliocco, L'errance post-mortem d'une identité fragmentée. "Pudrã" de Dora Pavel entre Néo-Gothique et Postmoderne, in L'errance post-mortem d'une identité fragmentée. "Pudrã" de Dora Pavel entre Néo-Gothique et Postmoderne, in Caietele Echinox, vol. 35, 2018, p. 366‒398

Further reading
 Petru Poantă, Dicţionar de poeţi. Clujul contemporan (Dictionary of Poets. The Contemporary Cluj), Cluj, Ed. Clusium, 1999, pp. 141–143.
 Ion Bogdan Lefter, Scriitori români din anii '80-'90. Dicţionar bio-bibliografic (Romanian Writers of the '80s and '90s. Bio-Bibliographic Dictionary),  vol. III, Piteşti, Ed. Paralela 45, 2001, pp. 27–28.
 Laurenţiu Ulici, Prima verba, vol. IV, București, Ed. Muzeul Literaturii Române, 2004, pp. 345–346.
 Henri Zalis, O istorie condensată a literaturii române (1880–2000) (A Concise History of Romanian Literature), vol. I, Târgovişte, Ed. Bibliotheca, 2005, pp. 193–195.
 Dicţionarul general al literaturii române (The General Dictionary of Romanian Literature), P-R, București, Ed. Univers Enciclopedic, 2006, pp. 109–110.
 Aurel Sasu, Dicţionarul biografic al literaturii române (The Biographic Dictionary of Romanian Literature), M-Z, Piteşti, Ed. Paralela 45, 2006, p. 310.
 Dicţionar analitic de opere literare româneşti (The Analytic Dictionary of Romanian Literary Works), final edition, vol. I, Cluj, Casa Cărţii de Ştiinţă, 2007, pp. 20–22.

External links
 Contemporary Romanian Writers
  Agata murind, Ed. Polirom
  Captivul, Ed. Polirom
  Pudră, Ed. Polirom
  Do Not Cross, Ed. Polirom

1946 births
Living people
Romanian women novelists
Romanian women short story writers
Romanian short story writers
Romanian women poets
People from Deva, Romania
Babeș-Bolyai University alumni